Jocelyn Enriquez (born December 28, 1974) is a Filipino American dance-pop singer born and raised in the San Francisco Bay Area. Her most popular songs are "Do You Miss Me", "A Little Bit of Ecstasy", and the Stars on 54 (Enriquez alongside Ultra Naté and Amber) cover of Gordon Lightfoot's "If You Could Read My Mind". Her success helped inspire and pave the way for many Asian American, particularly Filipino Americans from the San Francisco Bay Area, artists during the mid to late 1990s such as Buffy, Kai, One Vo1ce, Pinay, Sharyn Maceren, and others.

Career
Enriquez was first heard singing at the age of 3 along to Anita Ward's "Ring My Bell". During her childhood she received formal voice training with the San Francisco Girl Chorus and San Francisco Opera Company. During high school she briefly joined girl group, Pinay Divas (later known as Pinay), a reference to girl group En Vogue who were known as the Funky Divas. She continued to perform around the Bay Area and eventually a demo of her singing "If You Leave Me Now" by Jaya caught the attention of Classified Records.

In late 1993, she recorded "I've Been Thinking About You" and in early 1994 the single was a success.  "I've Been Thinking About You" would garner a huge Freestyle fanbase with the East Mix which included a popular Freestyle sample at the time of the Afrika Bambaataa & Soul Sonic Force's "Planet Rock". The single gained heavy rotation in California, Texas, Florida, Illinois, and New York. As an homage to Victor Zaragoza, the DJ who in part broke the record on Enriquez's hometown radio station Wild 107.7, she recorded the song in Spanish too. Enriquez was labeled a "sell-out" by some members of the Philippine-American community because of her Spanish rendition of "I've Been Thinking About You".

Her debut album, Lovely was released in the summer of 1994, which was produced by Glenn Gutierrez and Mario L. Augustin Jr (who also worked with Stevie B. and Jaya), and Elvin Reyes. The album Lovely spawned several more singles "Make This Last Forever", "You Are The One", "Big Love", "Big Love (Energy Box Mixes)", and "Only". The second single "Make This Last Forever" was well received in the markets that supported the first single. Lovely, was released the summer of 1994. The third single released in the fall of 1994 "You Are The One" led her to perform in San Diego where she would be introduced to her future husband. The fourth single "Big Love" was heavily inspired by Donna Summer's "I Feel Love" would also be re-recorded, remixed and released as "Big Love (Energy Box Mixes)" as the album's fifth single. The last single "Only" was released on 12" and notably a fan favorite from the album.

In April 1996 "Do You Miss Me?" would debut on Wild 107.7 and quickly gained traction. The single eventually became a Top 40 hit on Dance and Pop radio (#17 and #38 peaks, respectively), and peaked at #49 on the Billboard Hot 100. The single was also successful outside of the U.S. where it reached #7 in Singapore and the Top 20 Pop in Canada. The music video was shot over a year later as the single maintained a popularity well into 1997 internationally.In 1996, Classified Records formed a joint venture with Tommy Boy Records and its imprint Timber! Records, this catapulted "Do You Miss Me?" as an international hit. Pop punk band Lucky Boys Confusion later covered "Do You Miss Me" on their 2001 album Throwing the Game.

The follow up single "A Little Bit of Ecstasy" peaked at #1 on the Billboard Hot Dance Music/Maxi-Singles Sales chart and #55 on the Billboard Hot 100. The video was directed by Francis Lawrence who went on to direct Jennifer Lopez's "Waiting For Tonight" music video and the box office hits "I Am Legend" and "Hunger Games". The single was originally intended to be released in the fall of 1996 however Jocelyn's high school knee injury caught up to her and was not able to walk. However, due to scheduling she still recorded the video with an injured knee. As a compromise Jocelyn was lifted around set and stayed stationary for her shots. After filming she had surgery and returned to the stage for the San Francisco Bammie Awards in early 1997. She won for "Artist of the Year" and performed "A Little Bit of Ecstasy" for the first time. The success of the single also led her perform on MTV's "The Grind" and included in the box office hit "A Night At The Roxbury" film and soundtrack. Years later the song was licensed to the DDRMAX2 PlayStation 2 game. A cover version by Josie was released on the Power Dance Hits Volume 1.

After a long wait the Jocelyn album was finally released in May 1997. The album peaked at #182 on the Billboard 200 albums chart and at #11 on the Billboard Top Heatseekers chart. The saw three commercially released singles: "Do You Miss Me", "A Little Bit Of Ecstasy", and "Get Into The Rhythm". "Even If" was opted as a single, Soul Solution remix eventually leaked, however the single never happened. "Stay With Me" was exclusively released as a single in Brazil. The album would pave the way for her to perform internationally and lead to the Jocelyn Philippines Album Tour. She made several appearances on TV, radio, and venues. While on Showbiz Lingo Splash she shared the stage with Filipina icons Pops Fernandez, Ella Mae, Verni Varga, Zsa Zsa, and Jaya where they closed the performance singing "Even If".

Unfortunately, the joint venture between Classified Records and Tommy Boy Music ended and Enriquez opted to stay with Tommy Boy. She began working on material for her then third album which was intended to venture Jocelyn in a more Pop/R&B sound incorporating her Dance audience.

In 1998, Enriquez, Amber, and Ultra Naté joined for a cover the Gordon Lightfoot 1971 hit "If You Could Read My Mind" as Stars on 54. The group's rendition of "If You Could Read My Mind" wound up impacting various charts worldwide, it landed at #3 on the Billboard Dance Club Songs and #52 on the Hot 100. The song would be the lead single for the film 54's soundtrack. The film's initial cut was rejected by Miramax, which lead to the a new cut to be made. This led to the Stars on 54 cameo at end of the theatrical released edit. Enriquez's response to appearing in the film "My hair was so huge, oh my goodness. It was crazy! To be able film it at the actual venue, that was pretty cool."

The birth of her first child led to a brief hiatus and halt on her third album. In 2000, she returned with the Thunderpuss produced "When I Get Close to You" and hit #1 on Billboards Hot Dance Music/Club Play chart. This single led her to being the vocalist for "So Fabulous, So Fierce (Freak Out)", an interpolation of the disco anthem Chic's "Le Freak". The song appeared on the Disney "102 Dalmatians" film/soundtrack, and also appears in the Dance Dance Revolution video game series.

After being released from Tommy Boy Jocelyn landed a distribution deal with Bayside Entertainment in 2002.  She then launched her own label J.E.M. Entertainment. Her third album, All My Life, was released in 2003. The first single of the album "No Way No How", produced by Al B Rich and penned by Dee Roberts. The single peaked at #1 on the Hot Dance Music/Club Play chart. The second and last single from the album was "Why." After the second single she decided to focus on her family and faith and take a break from the music industry.

In 2018 she released the single "To Love Again". This would also mark the 20 year anniversary of "If You Could Read My Mind", in which Enriquez was interviewed for the Billboard article "Ultra Naté, Amber and Jocelyn Enriquez on their 1998 Stars on 54 Collaboration 'If You Could Read My Mind'". Enriquez reflected on how she landed on the single, "They said, "This is a good opportunity, but you have to go now!" I want to say I was in New York within three days so that I could record the song. We would all sing different harmonies and ad-libs, but never really saw the big picture until the end. So it was kind of mysterious how we recorded it." The following year Enriquez also embarked on a Philippines Tour to promote "To Love Again". In 2020, she released a re-recorded version of "You Are The One". Production duo Black Caviar released a cover of "A Little Bit of Ecstasy" that same year. Her last single "Beauty Comes Through Pain" is distributed by Warner Bros Philippines. Jocelyn continues to perform live and active on her social media.

Personal life
She graduated from Pinole Valley High School in 1993. Enriquez is married to Pastor Alain Macasadia. They formerly served at Calvary Chapel of San Diego doing worship and children's ministry. They moved to San Antonio in 2005. In 2006, Macasadia became the worship leader of Calvary Chapel San Antonio. They have four children, Matthew, Ashley, Jonathan, and Timothy.

Discography
 
Lovely (1994)
Jocelyn (1997)
All My Life (2003)

See also 
List of number-one dance hits (United States)
List of artists who reached number one on the US Dance chart

References

External links 
Jocelyn Enriquez on Apple Music
Music Video for "Do You Miss Me"
Music Video for "A Little Bit of Ecstasy" (directed by Francis Lawrence)
Music Video for "If You Could Read My Mind"
Music Video for "I've Been Thinking About You"
Jocelyn Enriquez Instagram
Jocelyn Enriquez Facebook
Jocelyn's Official Website
Vocal Production for "All My Life"

1974 births
21st-century American singers
21st-century American women singers
American freestyle musicians
American house musicians
American musicians of Filipino descent
American people of Ilocano descent
American pop musicians
American women in electronic music
Filipino dance musicians
Filipino freestyle musicians
Living people
Singers from San Francisco
Video game musicians
Dance-pop musicians